The Threesome of the Air is a 1951 Spanish comedy drama film directed by Ramón Torrado and starred by Antonio Casal, Antonio Riquelme and Beni Deus. It was written by Ángel Pageo and Adolfo Torrado.

Cast

References

External links
 

Films shot in Madrid
Films directed by Ramón Torrado
Films scored by Jesús García Leoz
1951 comedy-drama films
1951 films
Films produced by Cesáreo González
Spanish comedy-drama films
Spanish black-and-white films